Blythe Laura Metz (born 1977), also known as Blythe Metz-Mändmets, is an American actress, writer, natural lifestyle expert, and motivational speaker.

Life
Metz was educated at Arizona State University, graduating BA in performing arts in 2000. An early screen role was as a beauty Queen in Miss Cast Away and the Island Girls (2004), while her first lead parts came in Jacqueline Hyde (2005) and Nightmare Man (2006).

Lynda Carter proposed Catherine Zeta-Jones, Cindy Crawford, and Metz as candidates for the role of Wonder Woman.

A raw vegan chef, and a promoter of natural beauty aids, Metz created adjustable wire-rimmed glasses to promote the benefits of cucumber slices applied under the eyes.

As a vlogger, Metz has sparked controversy by claims on her YouTube channel about natural treatments for cancer. In a video with over 600,000 views, she says  "There are alternatives that have been sacked because they are a threat to this multi-trillion dollar business."

Metz is married to Indrek Mändmets, an Estonian.

Films
Miss Cast Away and the Island Girls (2004) as Miss Delaware
Jacqueline Hyde (2005) as Jacqueline Hyde
Nightmare Man (2006) as Ellen
Bred in the Bone (2006) as Gigi Andrews 
Abe & Bruno (2006), as Sara
The Craving Heart (2006) as Walela 
The Thirst (2006) as Sasha 
Dinoshark (2010) as Newscaster

Television
Perception (2012) as Athena

Awards
Action on Film International Film Festival 2005, Best Actress, for Bred in the Bone (2006)
Judges Choice Awards 2006, Best Actress, for The Craving Heart (2006)
Tabloid Witch Awards 2006, Best Actress for Nightmare Man (2006)

Nominations
 Action on Film International Film Festival 2012, Best Actress Nomination for Perception (2012)

Notes

External links
Blythe Metz, IMDb
Blythenaturalliving, personal web site 
Blythe Metz, growingnaturals.com

1977 births
American film actresses
American television actresses
Arizona State University alumni
Living people
21st-century American women
Raw foodists